is a railway station on the Sanriku Railway Company’s Rias Line located in the village of Fudai, Iwate Prefecture, Japan.

Lines
Shiraikaigan Station is served by the  Rias Line, and is located 140.3 rail kilometers from the terminus of the line at Sakari Station.

Station layout 
The station has one side platform serving a single bi-directional track. There is no station building. The station is unattended.

Adjacent stations

History 
Shiraikaigan Station opened on 22 December 1984. Following the 11 March 2011 Tōhoku earthquake and tsunami, services on a portion of the Sanriku Railway were suspended. The portion from Rikuchū-Noda to Tanohata resumed operations on 1 April 2012. Minami-Rias Line, a portion of Yamada Line, and Kita-Rias Line constitute Rias Line on 23 March 2019. Accordingly, this station became an intermediate station of Rias Line.

Surrounding area 
 National Route 45

See also
 List of railway stations in Japan

References

External links

  

Railway stations in Iwate Prefecture
Railway stations in Japan opened in 1984
Rias Line
Fudai, Iwate